The Salt Lake Golden Eagles were a minor professional hockey team based in Salt Lake City from 1969 to 1994.

History
They played in the Western Hockey League from 1969 to 1974, the Central Hockey League from 1974 to 1984 and the International Hockey League from 1984 to 1994. The Golden Eagles home arena was the Salt Palace from 1969 to 1991 and the Delta Center (now called Vivint Arena) from 1991 to 1994. In 1994 Larry H. Miller, who also owned the Utah Jazz and the Delta Center, sold the team to Detroit interests. The Golden Eagles became the Detroit Vipers.

NHL parent clubs.
WHL: 
California Golden Seals (1972-1974)
Buffalo Sabres (1970-1972)
Montreal Canadiens (1969-1970)
Boston Bruins (1969-1970) 

CHL:
Minnesota North Stars (1983-1984)
St. Louis Blues (1977-1983)
Cleveland Barons (NHL) (1976-1977)
California Golden Seals (1974-1976)
Los Angeles Kings (1974-1975) 

IHL:
New York Islanders (1993-1994)
Calgary Flames (1987-1993)

Players

Season-by-season results
 Salt Lake Golden Eagles 1969–1974 (Western Hockey League)
 Salt Lake Golden Eagles 1974–1984 (Central Hockey League)
 Salt Lake Golden Eagles 1984–1994 (International Hockey League)

Regular season

Playoffs

References

External links
The Internet Hockey Database - Salt Lake Golden Eagles (WHL)
The Internet Hockey Database - Salt Lake Golden Eagles (CHL)
The Internet Hockey Database - Salt Lake Golden Eagles (IHL)
Salt Lake Golden Eagles History Page

 
Sports in Salt Lake City
Central Professional Hockey League teams
International Hockey League (1945–2001) teams
Ice hockey teams in Utah
Defunct ice hockey teams in the United States
Ice hockey clubs established in 1969
Sports clubs disestablished in 1994
Boston Bruins minor league affiliates
Calgary Flames minor league affiliates
Cleveland Barons minor league affiliates
Hartford Whalers minor league affiliates
New York Rangers minor league affiliates
New York Islanders minor league affiliates
Western Hockey League (1952–1974) teams
1969 establishments in Utah
1994 disestablishments in Utah